Bella Alekseïevna Bournasheva (Бэлла Алексеевна Бурнашева, b. 1944) is a Soviet–Russian astronomer credited with the discovery of several asteroids.

The minor planet 4427 Burnashev was named in honour of her and her husband Vladislav Ivanovich Burnashev.

References 
 

1944 births
Discoverers of asteroids

Place of birth missing (living people)
Soviet women scientists
Living people
Soviet astronomers
Women astronomers